Phallus cinnabarinus is a species of fungus in the stinkhorn family. Originally named in 1957 as Dictyophora cinnabarina, it was transferred to the genus Phallus in 1996 by Hanns Kreisel. It is found in Taiwan.

References

External links

Fungi described in 1957
Fungi of Asia
Phallales